Yargo, Boulkiemdé is a village in the Siglé Department of Boulkiemdé Province in central western Burkina Faso. It has a population of 215.

References

Populated places in Boulkiemdé Province